The 1985 NHK Trophy was held at the Port Island Sports Center in Kobe on November 21–24. Medals were awarded in the disciplines of men's singles, ladies' singles, pair skating, and ice dancing.

Results

Men

Ladies

Pairs

Ice dancing

External links
 1985 NHK Trophy

Nhk Trophy, 1985
NHK Trophy